The Malaysian eared nightjar or Malay eared nightjar (Lyncornis temminckii) is a species of nightjar in the family Caprimulgidae. It is found in Brunei, Indonesia, Malaysia, Singapore, and Thailand. Its natural habitat is subtropical or tropical moist lowland forests.

References

Lyncornis
Birds described in 1838
Birds of Borneo
Taxonomy articles created by Polbot